Rudolf Kompfner (May 16, 1909 – December 3, 1977) was an Austrian-born inventor, physicist and architect, best known as the inventor of the traveling-wave tube (TWT).

Life 

Kompfner was born in Vienna to Jewish parents. He was originally trained as an architect and after receiving his university degree in 1933 he moved to England (due to the rise of anti-Semitism), where he worked as an architect until 1941. He had a strong interest in physics and electronics, and after being briefly detained by the British at the start of World War II he was recruited to work in a secret microwave vacuum tube research program at the University of Birmingham. While there, Kompfner invented the TWT in 1943. After the war he became a British citizen, continued working for the Admiralty as a scientist, and also studied physics at the University of Oxford, receiving his D.Phil. in 1951.

In 1965, he received an honorary doctorate from the Vienna University of Technology.

Patents 

1957

 Traveling Wave Tube Amplifier. (Issued 8/27/57.) 
 Traveling Wave Tube. (Issued 10/29/57.) 
 Electron Beam System. (Issued 11/5/57.)

1958

 Traveling Wave Tube. (Issued 5/13/58.) 
 Electron Beam System. (Issued 10/21/58.) 
 Non-reciprocal Wave Transmission. (Issued 11/11/58.)

1959

 Traveling Wave Tube. (Issued 1/6/59.) 
 Direct View Storage Tube. (Issued 3/24/59.) 
 Backward Wave Tube. (Issued 6/16/59.) 
 Traveling Wave Tube. (Issued 7/14/59.) 
 Apparatus Utilizing Slalom Focusing. (Issued 8/11/59.) 
 Non-reciprocal Wave Transmission Device. (Issued 11/3/59.) 
 Backward Wave Amplifier. (Issued 12/8/59.)

1960

 Non-reciprocal Elements in Microwave Tubes. (Issued 1/26/60.) 
 Coaxial Couplers. (Issued 2/16/60.) 
 Pulse Coincidence Detecting Tube. (Issued 4/19/60.) 
 Electron Gun for Slalom Focusing Systems. (Issued 5/31/60.) 
 High Efficiency Velocity Modulation Devices. (Issued 8/16/60.) 
 Traveling Wave Tube. (Issued 10/4/60.)

1961

 Low Noise Amplifier. (Issued 2/14/61.) 
 High Frequency Amplifier. (Issued 2/21/61.) 
 Backward Wave Tube. (Issued 5/23/61.) 
 Elastic Wave Parametric Amplifier. (Issued 12/5/61.)

1962

 Parallel High Frequency Amplifier Circuits. (Issued 2/15/62.)  
 Scanning Horn-Reflector Antenna. (Issued 2/13/62.)  
 Microwave Filter. (Issued 6/26/62.)  
 Broadband Cyclotron Wave Parametric Amplifier. (Issued 8/28/62.)  
 High Frequency Generator. (Issued 12/4/62.)

1964

 Traveling Wave Light Modulator. (Issued 5/12/64.) 
 Artificial Scattering Elements for Use as Reflectors in Space Communication Systems. (Issued 9/29/64.) 
 Detector for Optical Communication System. (Issued 10/27/64.)

1965

 Beam Collector with Auxiliary Collector for Repelled or Secondarily-Emitted Electrons. (Issued 6 /8/65.)  
 Antenna System. (Issued 7/20/65.)  
 Sinusoidal-Shaped Lens for Light Wave Communication. (Issued 12/21/65.) 
 Transmission of Light Waves. (Issued 12/21/65.)

1966

 Optical Maser Amplifier. (Issued 5/24/66.)  
 Antenna System. (Issued 9/13/66.)  
 Triple Element S-Lens Focusing System. (Issued 11/15/66.)

1967

 Spherical Reflector Elastic Wave Delay Device with Planar Transducers. (Issued 5/2/67.)

1969

 Intracavity Image Converter. (Issued 7/8/69.)

1970

 Receiving Antenna Apparatus Compensated for Antenna Surface Irregularities. (Issued 1/13/70.)
 Anti-Doppler Shift Antenna for Mobile Radio. (Issued 3/24/70.) 
 Multiple-Pass Light-Deflecting Modulator. (Issued 3/31/70.) 
 Multiple-Pass Light-Deflecting Modulator. (Issued 3/31/70.) 
 Optical Waveguide. (Issued 4/14/70.) 
 Time Division Multiplex Optical Transmission System. (Issued 4/l4/70.) 
 Digital Light Deflecting Systems. (Issued 6/2/70.) 
 Method and Apparatus for Obtaining 3-Dimensional Images from Recorded Standing Patterns. (Issued 7/14/70.) 
 Optical Heterodyne Receiver with Pulse Widening or Stretching. (Issued 9/22/70.) 
 Light Communication System with Improved Signal- to-Noise Ratio. (Issued 10/6/70.)

1977

 Method of and Apparatus for Acoustic Imaging. (Issued 3/15/77.)

References

 Oxford Dictionary of National Biography

External links
 , p. 4
National Academy of Sciences Biographical Memoir

1909 births
1977 deaths
Austrian Jews
British Jews
British physicists
American electrical engineers
Austrian electrical engineers
National Medal of Science laureates
IEEE Medal of Honor recipients
Jewish American scientists
Scientists at Bell Labs
Jews who immigrated to the United Kingdom to escape Nazism
British electrical engineers
Alumni of the University of Oxford
Academics of the University of Birmingham
20th-century American engineers
Members of the United States National Academy of Sciences
20th-century American Jews